Štip is a municipality in eastern North Macedonia. Štip is also the name of the town where the municipal seat is found. This municipality is part of the Eastern Statistical Region.

Geography
Štip Municipality covers an area of 583.24 km². The river Bregalnica runs through the municipality.

The municipality borders
 Probištip Municipality and Sveti Nikole Municipality to the north,
 Radoviš and Karbinci municipalities to the east,
 Lozovo and Gradsko municipalities to the west, and
 Konče Municipality to the south.

Demographics
At the census of 2021 the municipality had 44,866 residents.

At the census taken in 1994 the number of inhabitants was 46,372 and in 2002 the number of inhabitants was 47,796.

Ethnic groups in the municipality:

Inhabited places
The number of the inhabited places in the municipality is 44.

References

External links
 Official website

 
Municipalities of North Macedonia
Eastern Statistical Region